Robert David Eric Gallagher CBE, (24 August 1913 – 30 December 1999) was President of the Methodist Church in Ireland during 1967.

In 1974 he was one of a group of Protestant clergymen who met with Provisional IRA officers in Feakle, County Clare in the 1970s to try to broker a peace after achieving a temporary ceasefire. The meeting was broken up by the Gardaí but the IRA officers had already left. He spent 22 years as superintendent of the Belfast Central Mission, from 1957 until 1979.

He died on 30 December 1999, aged 86, and was interred at the Lisburn New Cemetery at Blaris, County Down.

Legacy
At Gallagher's funeral in January 2000, Cardinal Cahal Daly, with whom Gallagher had jointly chaired a social issues group behind the Violence in Ireland report to the churches stated: "Not many people have been clear and steady beacons of light in the darkness of the last 30 years. Eric Gallagher was one ... [I]t was a privilege to work with him ... he took risks for peace."

Other
Gallagher was the subject of Peacemaker, written by Dennis Cooke.

References

External links
Bibliography
World Methodist Council website
Presbyterian Ireland news-site

1913 births
1999 deaths
Commanders of the Order of the British Empire
Methodist ministers from Northern Ireland
People from County Down
Place of death missing
Presidents of the Methodist Church in Ireland